Chronic Respiratory Disease is a quarterly peer-reviewed medical journal that covers research in the field of respiratory disease, including chronic obstructive pulmonary disease, respiratory failure, and obstructive sleep apnea. The editors-in-chief are Mike Morgan (Glenfield Hospital), Carolyn Rochester (Yale University), and Sally Singh (Glenfield Hospital). It was established in 2004 and is published by SAGE Publications.

Abstracting and indexing 
The journal is abstracted and indexed in:
 EMBASE
 MEDLINE
 Scopus
 Zetoc

External links 
 

SAGE Publishing academic journals
English-language journals
Pulmonology journals
Publications established in 2004
Quarterly journals